ACCC (Aluminum Conductor Composite Core) is a registered trade mark for a type of "high-temperature low-sag" (HTLS) overhead power line conductor manufactured by 34 international (and authorized) conductor manufacturers.

Invention 
CTC Global (formerly Composite Technology Corporation) developed the patented technology. The ACCC conductor's composite core is manufactured according to ASTM B987 / B987M - 20 “Standard Specification for Carbon Fiber Thermoset Polymer Matrix Composite Core (CFC) for use in Overhead Electrical Conductors.” CTC Global manufactures ACCC core in the US and with partners in China and Indonesia. Finished ACCC conductor is produced by 34 conductor manufacturers worldwide under license. As of May 2021, the ACCC Conductor has been selected by over 250 utilities in 60 countries for more than 1,000 projects ranging from 11kV (AC) to 1,100kV (DC).

Advantages
It is able to carry approximately twice as much current as a traditional aluminium-conductor steel-reinforced cable (ACSR) cable of the same size and weight, making it popular for retrofitting an existing electric power transmission line without needing to change the existing towers and insulators.

In addition to the labor and materials savings, such an upgrade can be performed as a "maintenance and repair" operation, without the lengthy permitting process required for new construction.

It does this by replacing the steel core in ACSR cable with a carbon and glass fiber strength member formed by pulltrusion.  This composite strength member provides several advantages:

 It is lighter.  The weight saved can be used for more aluminium conductor.  ACCC cable uses trapezoidal strands to fit more aluminium into the same cable diameter.
 Softer, fully annealed aluminium can be used for the conductors.  ACSR cable uses stronger non-annealed commercially pure aluminium which contributes to the cable's tensile strength and improves sag and pull-out under ice load, but has about 3% less electrical conductivity and limits the maximum operating temperature.
 It has a much lower coefficient of thermal expansion (CTE) than ACSR.  This lets the cable be operated at a significantly higher temperature without excessive sag between poles.

The first two factors result in roughly 30% greater conductivity than an equivalent ACSR conductor, allowing 14% more current to be carried at equal temperature.  For example,  diameter ACCC "Drake" conductor at 75 °C has an AC resistance of 106 mΩ/mile, while equivalent ACSR conductor has an AC resistance of 139 mΩ/mile, 31% higher.

The remaining capacity increase is provided by an increased operating temperature of  continuous and  emergency, compared to  continuous and  emergency for ACSR.

The manufacturers rate the cable for continuous operation at 180 °C surface temperature, 
Operation at these temperatures implies high line losses, which may be uneconomical, but the ability to carry such current contributes to the redundancy of the electric grid (the high overload capacity can stop a potential cascading failure) and thus can be valuable even when rarely used directly. Even at higher operating temperatures, the ACCC conductor's added aluminum content and lower electrical resistance offers reduced line losses compared to other conductors of the same diameter and weight.

Disadvantages

 The primary disadvantage is cost; ACCC costs 2.5–3 times as much as ACSR cable.
 Although ACCC has significantly less thermal sag than even other HTLS conductor designs, it has a lower axial stiffness. Therefore, it sags more than other designs under ice load, although an "ultra-low-sag" (higher modulus) version is available at a cost premium. Also, other aluminium alloys with an increased strength at the expense of electrical conductivity can be used to improve ice load sag. Ice load can also lead to the loosening of outer layer strands because of plastic deformation by the attached weight. 
 Annealed aluminium is extremely soft and makes the conductor prone to surface damage.
 The conductor has a larger minimum bend radius, requiring extra care during installation.  
 The conductor requires special fittings and stringing equipment that are more expensive.

References

Power cables